Camelot is a 1967 American musical fantasy drama film directed by Joshua Logan and written by Alan Jay Lerner, based on the 1960 stage musical of the same name by Lerner and Frederick Loewe. It stars Richard Harris as King Arthur, Vanessa Redgrave as Guenevere, and Franco Nero as Lancelot. The cast also features David Hemmings, Lionel Jeffries, and Laurence Naismith.

In April 1961, the rights to produce a film adaptation of Camelot were obtained by Warner Bros. with Lerner attached to write the screenplay. However, the film was temporarily shelved as the studio decided to adapt My Fair Lady into a feature film first. In 1966, development resumed with Joshua Logan hired as director. Original cast members Richard Burton and Julie Andrews were approached to reprise their roles from the stage musical, but both declined and were replaced with Harris and Redgrave. Filming took place on location in Spain and on the Warner Bros. studio lot in Burbank, California.

Camelot was released on October 25, 1967, to mixed reviews from critics, but was a commercial success, grossing $31.5 million against a $13 million budget, becoming the tenth highest-grossing film of 1967. The film received five nominations at the 40th Academy Awards and won three; Best Score, Best Production Design, and Best Costume Design. It also won three Golden Globe Awards; Best Actor – Motion Picture Musical or Comedy (Richard Harris), Best Original Song (for "If Ever I Would Leave You"), and Best Original Score.

Plot
As King Arthur prepares for battle against his former friend, Sir Lancelot, he reflects on the sad circumstances which have led him to this situation.

Arthur thinks back to the night of his marriage to Guenevere. It is an arranged marriage, and he is afraid of what lies ahead ("I Wonder What the King is Doing Tonight"). Guenevere herself is worried about marrying a man she has never met and longs for the romantic life of a fought-over maiden ("The Simple Joys of Maidenhood"). They converse, and as she does not know his true identity, she fantasizes about escaping with him. Arthur tells her what a wonderful place his kingdom is ("Camelot"). She finds herself drawn to him, but they are interrupted by his men and her entourage. Arthur's identity is revealed, and Guenevere gladly goes with him to be married.

Four years later, Arthur explores with Guenevere his idea for a "Round Table" that would seat all the noble knights of the realm, reflecting not only a crude type of democratic ideal, but also the political unification of England. Inspired by Arthur's ideas, the French Knight Lancelot makes his way to England with his squire Dap, boasting of his superior virtues ("C'est Moi"). Lancelot's prowess impresses Arthur, and they become friends; however, many of the knights instantly despise Lancelot for his self-righteousness and boasting manner. Back in Camelot, Guinevere and the women frolic and gather flowers to celebrate the coming of spring ("The Lusty Month of May").

Guenevere, who initially dislikes Lancelot, incites three of the best knights to challenge him to a joust ("Then You May Take Me To The Fair"). Arthur ponders how distant Guenevere has become recently ("How to Handle a Woman"). Guenevere's plan goes awry as Lancelot easily defeats all three, critically wounding Sir Dinadan. A horrified Lancelot pleads for Sir Dinadan to live, and as he lays hands on him, Dinadan miraculously recovers. Guenevere is so overwhelmed and humbled that her feelings for Lancelot begin to change. Despite his vows of celibacy, Lancelot falls in love with Guenevere. 
 
Guinevere and Lancelot meet in secret to discuss their future. Lancelot vows that he should leave and never come back, but finds it impossible to consider leaving Guenevere ("If Ever I Would Leave You"). Arthur decides to rise above the scandal. Mordred, Arthur's illegitimate son, arrives at Camelot determined to bring down the fellowship of the Round Table by stirring up trouble. All this takes its toll on Arthur's disposition, and Guenevere tries to cheer him up ("What Do the Simple Folk Do?") despite her conflicted emotions.

Mordred persuades Arthur to stay out hunting all night as a test, knowing that Lancelot will visit Guenevere in her bedchamber. Lancelot and Guenevere sing of their forbidden love and how wrong it has all gone ("I Loved You Once In Silence"). Mordred and several knights catch the lovers together. Lancelot escapes, but Guenevere is arrested. Thanks to Arthur's new civil court and trial by jury, she is sentenced to die by burning at the stake. Bound by his own law, Arthur cannot spare her. Preparations are made for Guenevere's burning ("Guenevere"), but Lancelot rescues her at the last minute, much to Arthur's relief.

On the battlefield, Arthur receives a surprise visit from Lancelot and Guenevere, at the edge of the woods, where she has taken residence at a convent. The three share an emotional farewell.

Prior to the battle, Arthur stumbles across a young boy named Tom, who espouses his commitment to Arthur's original ideal of "Not might 'makes' right, but might 'for' right." Arthur realizes that, although most of his plans have fallen through, the ideals of Camelot still live on in this simple boy. Arthur knights Tom and gives him his orders—run behind the lines and survive the battle, so that he can tell future generations about the legend of Camelot. Watching Tom leave, Arthur regains his hope for the future ("Camelot (reprise)").

Production

Development
In April 1961, it was reported that Warner Bros. had purchased the rights to produce a film adaptation of the stage musical with Alan Jay Lerner hired to pen the screenplay. That same month, it was reported that Rock Hudson had signed on to portray King Arthur. In May 1961, Shirley Jones was reportedly in talks to portray Guenevere. However, development was placed on hold when Warner Bros. fast-tracked a film adaptation of the musical My Fair Lady, for which they acquired the screen rights from CBS for $5.5 million. It was also stipulated that Camelot would not be released before April 1964. Nevertheless, in April 1963, Jack L. Warner hired television executive William T. Orr to serve as producer. It was also reported that Orr had sought for original cast members Richard Burton and Robert Goulet to star in their respective roles, along with Elizabeth Taylor to star as Guenevere. In December 1963, Orr left the project after being appointed to serve as Jack L. Warner's executive assistant.

Robert Wise was offered the opportunity to direct, but production chief Walter MacEwen noted that "He does not want to type himself as a director of musical subjects—and he still has The Gertrude Lawrence Story, which falls in that category, on his slate for next year." In March 1966, it was reported that Joshua Logan had been hired as director, with principal photography slated to commence in August.

Casting

Warner approached Burton to reprise his stage role as Arthur, but he demanded a higher salary than the studio was willing to pay, in which the negotiations ceased. In his place, Peter O'Toole, Gregory Peck and Marlon Brando were considered. While filming Hawaii (1966), Richard Harris learned of Camelot and actively sought for the role. For four months, Harris sent complimentary letters, cables and offers for a screen test to Lerner, Logan and Jack Warner indicating his interest in the role. Logan refused his offer due to his lack of singing abilities. When Logan returned to the Dorchester after having his morning jog, Harris ambushed him about the role, in which Logan finally relented as he offered to pay for his own screen test. Harris later hired cinematographer Nicolas Roeg to direct his screen test, which impressed Logan and Warner, who both agreed to hire him.

For the role of Guenevere, Julie Andrews, Audrey Hepburn and Julie Christie were on the studio's shortlist while Jack Warner separately considered Polly Bergen, Ann-Margret and Mitzi Gaynor. Andrews had learned of the movie adaptation while filming Hawaii, but she declined. However, Logan desperately wanted to cast Vanessa Redgrave after watching her performance in Morgan – A Suitable Case for Treatment (1966). At the time, Redgrave was performing in the stage play The Prime of Miss Jean Brodie so Logan had to wait several months for her availability. Despite Redgrave not being a traditional singer, Logan was impressed by her renditions of folk songs that he listened to. The studio was initially reluctant due to her left-wing activism, but Logan negotiated for her casting until after she fulfilled her stage commitments. Redgrave was signed in November 1966 for $200,000 and permitted to do her own singing.

Although the studio initially sought a Frenchman, Italian actor Franco Nero was cast as Lancelot based on the recommendation from Harris and John Huston who worked with Nero on The Bible: In the Beginning... (1966). Although Logan was aware of Nero's thick Italian accent, he initially permitted him to do his own singing. The first scene shot was his performance of the musical number "C'est Moi", by which Logan found Nero's singing voice incompatible with the song's musical arrangement. His singing voice was dubbed by Gene Merlino while Nero was given a speech coach to help improve his English.

Filming

Richard H. Kline came to the attention of Logan after he had watched footage from Chamber of Horrors (1966), which contained medieval castle doors with a carriage drawn by a team of gray horses rolling through a bricked courtyard that had been shot with muted colors of the woods and mist. Impressed, Logan hired Kline as cinematographer. For Camelot, Kline wanted to shoot the film in a more authentically textured style rather than the polished look of Hollywood musicals.

As his first film credit, 29-year-old Australian set designer John Truscott, who created the sets for the London and Melbourne stage productions of Camelot, was hired as production designer. According to Logan, Truscott envisioned the visual design that resembled "neither Gothic or Romanesque but an in between period, suggesting a legendary time". The Castillo de Coca was the inspiration for the film's production design, which was re-created on the studio backlot in Burbank, California. The finished castle became the largest set ever constructed at the time, measuring 400 by 300 feet, and being nearly 100 feet tall, with the reported cost totaling half a million dollars. Logan explained to the Los Angeles Times that "it was absolutely necessary since we expect to do everything right in this picture—even to matching Spanish and Hollywood cobblestones."

In September 1966, shooting commenced on location in Spain intended for a 30-day shooting schedule. For the exterior sets, Logan selected seven castles on the country's mainland and another one on the island of Majorca, of which included the Alcázar of Segovia that was used as Lancelot du Lac's castle and the Medina del Campo. However, the location shoot experienced setbacks due to the country's rainfall and high temperature, in which filming finished twelve days behind schedule. In total, the shoot yielded half an hour of usable footage. With production underway, Jack Warner decided that Camelot would be his last film he would produce for the studio. On November 14, 1966, he sold a substantial share of studio stock to Seven Arts Productions. The sale was finalized on November 27, which totaled to approximately $32 million in cash.

Following the location shoot in Spain, the filming unit took a hiatus until Redgrave finished her stage duties. By then, fifteen of the studio's twenty-three stage sets were occupied for Camelot. Filming was further complicated when Harris required 12 facial stitches after he fell down in his shower. The stitches reopened when Harris went out to party (against the doctor's orders), and this further delayed his recovery. Plastic surgery was later applied to disguise the wound.

Music

On the LP soundtrack album, "Take Me to the Fair" appears after "How to Handle a Woman", and "Follow Me" (with new lyrics written for the film) is listed after "The Lusty Month of May".

Certifications

Historical context
William Johnson, writing in the journal Film Quarterly, noted that "some of Arthur's speeches could be applied directly to Vietnam," such as Arthur's "Might for Right" ideal and repeated musings over borderlines. Retrospectively, Alice Grellner suggested the movie served as "an escape from the disillusionment of Vietnam, the bitterness and disenchantment of the antiwar demonstrations, and the grim reality of the war on the evening television news" and reminder of John F. Kennedy's presidency.

Release
On October 25, 1967, Camelot premiered at the Warner Theatre on Broadway and 47th Street. A benefit premiere was held on November 1 at the Cinerama Dome in Los Angeles. While the official running time was 180 minutes plus overture, entr'acte and exit music, only the 70mm blow up prints and 35mm magnetic stereo prints contained that running time. For the general wide release, the film was truncated to 150 minutes.

Home media
In April 2012, the film was released on Blu-ray in conjunction with the film's 45th anniversary. The release was accompanied with an audio commentary, four behind-the-scenes featurettes and five theatrical trailers. Camelot will be released in Ultra HD Blu-ray on November 9, 2022, by Warner Bros. Home Entertainment.

Reception

Box office
Camelot was ranked as the tenth highest-grossing film of 1967 earning $12.3 million in United States and Canadian rentals. During its 1973 re-release, the film grossed $2 million in box office rentals.

Critical reaction
Film Quarterlys William Johnson called Camelot "Hollywood at its best and worst," praising the film's ideals and Harris and Redgrave's performances but bemoaning its lavish sets and three-hour-running time. Bosley Crowther of The New York Times called Redgrave "dazzling" but criticized the film's conflicting moods and uncomfortable close-ups. Crowther felt the main characters were not sufficiently fleshed out to evoke any sympathy from the audience, concluding that the filmed lacked "magic". Variety magazine ran a positive review, declaring that the film "qualifies as one of Hollywood's alltime great screen musicals," praising the "clever screenplay" and "often exquisite sets and costumes." Clifford Terry of the Chicago Tribune was also positive, calling it "a beautiful, enjoyable splash of optical opiate" with "colorful sets, bright costumes and three fine performances."

Richard L. Coe of The Washington Post wrote, "Long, leaden and lugubrious, the Warner's 'Camelot' is 15 million dollars worth of wooden nickels. Besides being hopelessly, needlessly lavish, this misses the point squarely on the nail: what was so hot about King Arthur? We never really are told." He added that Richard Harris as Arthur gave "the worst major performance in years." Charles Champlin of the Los Angeles Times called the film "a very considerable disappointment," writing that its moments of charm "simply cannot cancel out the slow static pace, the lack of style, the pinched and artificial quality of the proceedings, the jumpy and inconsistent cuts, the incessant overuse of close-ups, the failure to sustain emotional momentum, the fatal wavering between reality and fantasy, the inability to exploit the resources of the film medium."

Brendan Gill of The New Yorker declared, "On Broadway, 'Camelot' was a vast, costly, and hollow musical comedy, and the movie version is, as might have been predicted, vaster, more costly, and even more hollow." The Monthly Film Bulletin of the UK wrote, "A dull play has become an even duller film, with practically no attempt at translation into the other medium, and an almost total neglect of the imaginative possibilities of the splendid material embodied in the Arthurian legend. Why, for instance, is Arthur not shown extracting Excalibur from the rock instead of merely talking about it? Such is the stuff of film scenes." On the review aggregator website Rotten Tomatoes, Camelot holds an approval rating of 41%, based on 17 reviews with an average rating of 6.23/10.

Awards and nominations

The film is recognized by American Film Institute in these lists:
 2004: AFI's 100 Years...100 Songs:	
 "Camelot" – Nominated

Legacy
Despite its high cost, Camelot was widely criticized for its cheap appearance because it had obviously been filmed on an architecturally ambiguous set amidst the chaparral-covered hills of Burbank, and not an authentic medieval castle amidst the green hills of England. As a result, Camelot was the last American film that attempted to physically construct a large-scale full-size set on a studio backlot to represent an exotic foreign location. To ensure authenticity, American filmmakers resorted to location shooting ever since for exterior shots.

A life-size statue of Richard Harris, as King Arthur from this film, has been erected in Bedford Row, in the centre of his home town of Limerick. The sculptor of this statue was the Irish sculptor Jim Connolly, a graduate of the Limerick School of Art and Design.

See also
List of American films of 1967
 List of films based on Arthurian legend

Notes

References

Bibliography

External links

 
 
 
 
 

1967 films
1960s English-language films
1960s romantic musical films
1960s musical comedy-drama films
1960s romantic comedy-drama films
American musical comedy-drama films
American romantic comedy-drama films
American romantic musical films
Arthurian films
Films based on musicals
American films based on plays
Films directed by Joshua Logan
Films featuring a Best Musical or Comedy Actor Golden Globe winning performance
Films scored by Alfred Newman
Films scored by Ken Darby
Films scored by Frederick Loewe
Films set in England
Films that won the Best Costume Design Academy Award
Films that won the Best Original Score Academy Award
Films whose art director won the Best Art Direction Academy Award
Films with screenplays by Alan Jay Lerner
Warner Bros. films
Films about royalty
Films based on adaptations
1967 comedy films
1967 drama films
Films set in castles
1960s American films